Maharana Mewar Public School is an English medium school, affiliated to the Central Board of Secondary Education, Delhi. It is a co-educational senior secondary school. It provides a platform for students to develop their careers in the field of engineering, medicine, arts and management. It gives due importance to physical education as well. It is located in the center of the ancient and historic city of Udaipur, near the City Palace, the palace of the rulers of Mewar.

The school is under a managing committee, constituted by Shriji Arvind Singhji Mewar of Udaipur, Chairman & Managing Trustee, Vidyadan Trust. Smt. Vijayaraj Kumari Mewar of Udaipur is the Chairperson of the Trust. The day-to-day affairs are looked by Mr. Lakshyaraj Singh of Udaipur. The principal is its ex officio Secretary.

See also
 List of schools in Udaipur, Rajasthan

References 

Schools in Udaipur
Educational institutions established in 1974
1974 establishments in Rajasthan